is a 1999 Japanese animated comedy film written and directed by Isao Takahata, animated by Studio Ghibli for Tokuma Shoten, Nippon Television Network, Hakuhodo and Buena Vista Home Entertainment, and distributed by Shochiku. It is based on the yonkoma manga Nono-chan by Hisaichi Ishii. A slice of life comedy-drama, the film stars Hayato Isobata, Masako Araki, Naomi Uno, Touru Masuoka, Yukiji Asaoka, Akiko Yano, and Kosanji Yanagiya. Unlike the other films of Studio Ghibli, the film is presented in a stylized comic strip aesthetic, a departure from the traditional anime style of the studio's other works.

Plot
The film is a series of vignettes following the daily lives of the Yamada family: Takashi and Matsuko (the father and mother), Shige (Matsuko's mother), Noboru (aged approximately 13, the son), Nonoko (aged approximately 7, the daughter), and Pochi (the family dog).

Each of the vignettes is preceded by a title such as "Father as Role Model", "A Family Torn Apart" or "Patriarchal Supremacy Restored". These vignettes cover such issues as losing a child in a department store, the relationships between father and son, or husband and wife, the wisdom of age, meeting one's first girlfriend and many more. Each is presented with humour, presenting a very believable picture of family life which crosses cultural boundaries. The relationships between Matsuko, Takashi and Shige are particularly well observed, with Shige giving advice and proverbs to all the family members, and having a great strength of character. Takashi and Matsuko's relationship is often the focus of the episodes, their rivalries, such as arguing about who has control of the television, their frustrations and their difficulties, but the overriding theme is their love for one another despite their flaws, and their desire to be the best parents possible for their children.

Voice cast

Japanese cast 
Touru Masuoka as Takashi Yamada
Yukiji Asaoka as Matsuko Yamada
Hayato Isobata as Noboru Yamada
Naomi Uno as Nonoko Yamada
Masako Araki as Shige Yamada
Akiko Yano as Fujihara-Sensei
Kosanji Yanagiya as Haiku Reader

English cast 
Jim Belushi as Takashi Yamada
Molly Shannon as Matsuko Yamada
Daryl Sabara as Noboru Yamada
Liliana Mumy as Nonoko Yamada
Tress MacNeille as Shige Yamada
David Ogden Stiers as Narrator

Additional voices English 
Jeff Bennett as Biker #1
Corey Burton as Biker #2
Dixie Carter as Lady #1
Erin Chambers as Girl #1
Maree Cheatham as Lady #2
Melissa Disney as Department store clerk and girl with umbrella
Amber Hood as Girl #2
Edie McClurg as Noboru's teacher
Jim Meskimen as Lead Biker
Jon Miller as Baseball announcer
Jeremy Shada as Tanaka
Billy West as Man talking to Takashi

Production 
Based on the yonkoma manga Nono-chan by Hisaichi Ishii, it is the first completely digital Studio Ghibli film. Takahata wanted Yamada-kun to have the art style of watercolor pictures rather than cel pictures. To achieve that, the traditional paint-on-cel techniques were replaced with digital technology, making Yamada-kun the first Ghibli film to have animation drawings painted entirely on computers.

Soundtrack 

The soundtrack was composed by Akiko Yano and it is characterised by very short piano themes, rather than the long orchestral themes composed by Joe Hisaishi, further adding to the film's distinction from the rest of Ghibli's filmography. Classical pieces played by Czech Philharmonic Chamber Orchestra conducted by Mario Klemens.
Released by Tokuma on 1 July 1999.

CD 1
 "Theme I: And So It Begins" 1:45
 "Joyous Music I: Going Forward with Reckless Abandon" 0:26
 "Cuckoo I: Not Like the Main Title" 0:28
 "Extract from Frédéric Chopin's "Nocturne No. 1 in B Flat Minor", Op. 9" 4:13
 "Extract from Gustav Mahler's "Symphony No. 5", 1st Movement, Funeral March" 0:29
 "Extract from Felix Mendelssohn's Wedding March" 4:22
 "My Neighbors the Yamadas" Theme (Orchestra Version)" 3:34
 Happy Bridge" 0:21
 "Evening Waltz Theme (Orchestra Version)" 1:43
 "Lively BGM" 3:21
 "The Dog's Policeman" 2:25
 "Troubles (BGM I)" 1:08
 "Troubles (BGM II)" 0:24
 "Sunset Scamper" (1:01)
 "Theme II: Thank Goodness" 1:11
 "Shut Up and Bring It Here!" 0:34
 "Joyous Music II: Please, Stop Pushing, Right Now!" 0:52
 "Cuckoo II: Oh, Welcome Home" 0:29
 "Happy Bridge II" 0:15
 "Takashi and Matsuko's Tango" 0:59
 "Pom Poko Tanuki Band" (Wakaya Rakudan) 1:13
 "Joyous Music III: A Happy Mouth" 0:25
 "A Father's Sorrow" 0:39
 "Paradise of Freedom" 0:23
 "Extract from Gustav Mahler's "Symphony No. 1", "Giant", 4th Movement	3:32
 "Theme III: Spring Rain" 3:32
 "Cuckoo III" 0:28
 "Cuckoo IV: The Correct Answer" 0:26
 "Cuckoo V"

CD 2
 "Round of Forgotten Things I: Morning Blessings" 1:16
 "Round of Forgotten Things II: Morning Blessings" 1:19
 "Cherry Cherry" 0:45
 "Extract from Tomaso Albinoni's Adagio" 2:07
 "Young People" 1:42
 "Cuckoo VI: Summer Dreams" 0:28
 "Joyous Music III: School is Fun" 0:50
 "Exciting BGM" 0:45
 "Telephone Line" (Akiko Yano) 2:56
 "Johann Sebastian Bach: Prelude and Fugue No. 8 in E Flat Minor" 4:14
 "Cheerful Music III: Going My Way" 1:16
 "Round of Forgotten Things: Bridge" 0:28
 "Round III of Forgotten Things: Good Advice" 0:36
 "The Masked Moonbeam Theme Song, "Who is the Masked Moonbeam?" (Yoshiko Kondou) 3:24
 "Broken Dreams" 0:24
 "Leopold Mozart's "Toy Symphony", Movement No. 2" 2:27
 "Que Sera, Sera (Whatever Will Be, Will Be)" 3:20
 "Quit Being Alone" 3:55

Release and reception 
The film was released in Japan on July 17, 1999. It was the only film produced by Ghibli to not be released by Toho or the Toei Company. It is one of only two films from Takahata to be distributed by neither company, the other being Gauche the Cellist.

The film received positive reviews, with praise to its unique visual style, humor and its observational look at modern Japanese suburban family life. On review aggregator site Rotten Tomatoes, My Neighbors the Yamadas has an approval rating of 78% based on 8 reviews and an average rating of 7.1/10. Ryan Lambie of Den of Geek awarded the film four stars and said, "Anyone expecting the soaring beauty of a typical Studio Ghibli production will probably be a little bemused by the mundanity of the Yamadas’ existence, but there’s a soothing calm to their daily struggles, a haiku-like sense of tranquillity." Empire rated it four stars and described the film as "an episodic piece that swaps narrative through-lines for a string of comedic observations on family dynamics. Witty, playful and gorgeous to look at." Sam Sewell-Peterson of The Film Magazine praised the film's visuals and called it "a soothing balm, a leisurely and pleasant look at domestic mundanity.

Despite the positive reviews, the film did not fare as well at the box office in Japan as other Ghibli films had done.

Home media 
The movie was released on VHS and DVD in Japan by Buena Vista Home Entertainment Japan on November 17, 2000. It is the first Studio Ghibli movie to be released on DVD.

My Neighbors the Yamadas was released on DVD in America on August 16, 2005, alongside another Takahata film, Pom Poko by Walt Disney Studios Home Entertainment. A Blu-ray version was released in Japan in 2010, and in the UK the following year. The US never got a Blu-ray release by Disney, but GKIDS released the film on Blu-ray for the first time in the US, as well as re-issuing the DVD under a new deal with Studio Ghibli on January 16, 2018.

Accolades 
My Neighbors the Yamadas received an Excellence Award for animation at the 1999 Japan Media Arts Festival.

References

External links 
 
 
 
 

1999 anime films
1999 animated films
1999 films
1990s Japanese-language films
Animated comedy films
Comedy anime and manga
Anime films based on manga
Films about dysfunctional families
Films directed by Isao Takahata
Hisaichi Ishii
Studio Ghibli animated films
Shochiku films
Films set in Japan
1990s children's animated films